IMC may refer to:

Aviation

 IMC rating, a UK-issued rating for flying in instrument meteorological conditions
 Instrument meteorological conditions, weather conditions that require pilots to fly primarily by instruments

Business 
 IMC AG, a publishing house and software company
 IMC Financial Markets, a privately held company headquartered in Amsterdam
 IMC Global (International Minerals and Chemical), a former mining and chemical business that merged into The Mosaic Company
 Integrated Marketing Communications, a body of academic and practical work promoting a management approach to marketing
 Intel Mobile Communications, a subsidiary of Intel Corporation
 International Market Centers, owner of furniture showroom space at World Market Center Las Vegas 
 International Metalworking Companies, a precision tools conglomerate headquartered in Israel

Mathematics competitions 
 Intermediate Mathematical Challenge, a challenge for students aged between 11 and 16, organised by the United Kingdom Mathematics Trust
 International Mathematics Competition for University Students, an annual mathematics competition for undergraduate mathematics students

Organizations 

 Immersive Media Company, former Canadian digital imaging company
 Investment Migration Council, sets standards in the investment migration industry
 Independent Media Center Also Indymedia or IMC. A global network of journalists that report on political and social issues.
 Independent Monitoring Commission, an organisation providing the British government with reports on paramilitary ceasefires in Northern Ireland
 Indian Muslim Council, an advocacy group based in the US
 Institute of Management Consultants USA, a national body certifying professional management consultants
 Intel Mobile Communications, a part of the Intel Architecture Group
 Intermountain Medical Center, a hospital in Murray, UT, USA
 International Maritime Confederation, the umbrella association of maritime organizations and marine societies on the European level
 International Marketmakers Combination, derivatives trading house
 International Medical Center, a hospital in Jeddah, Saudi Arabia
 International Medical Corps, a global, humanitarian, nonprofit organization
 International Medieval Congress, annual academy congress on the study of the European Middle Ages (c. 300–1500) held at the University of Leeds
 International Music Council, a UNESCO-sponsored organization promoting the development of international music-making
 Internet Mail Consortium, an organization providing information about Internet e-mail standards and technologies
 Irish Mountaineering Club
 Irish Multiplex Cinemas, a chain of cinemas in the Republic of Ireland and Northern Ireland owned by Ward Anderson
 Islamabad Metropolitan Corporation, the municipal authority governing Islamabad
 Irish Medical Council, the Irish regulatory body for the medical professions
 Indy's Music Channel, television station in Indianapolis, Indiana

Religion 
 A church of the Fellowship of Independent Methodist Churches
 Consolata Missionaries, Roman Catholic missionary congregation

Other uses 
 The Infinite Monkey Cage, a popular science radio programme in the United Kingdom
 Integrated memory controller, a feature of some CPUs in computers
 Instructional manipulation check, a question in a questionnaire to check whether respondents pay attention to the instructions
 Intermediate Metal Conduit, formal term in electrical codes for a type of metallic conduit (thin-wall tubing)
 International Championship for Manufacturers, a rally series and predecessor to the World Rally Championship
 International Mechanical Code, a convention published by the International Code Council (ICC) through the governmental consensus process
 Isothermal microcalorimetry (IMC), a laboratory method for real-time monitoring and dynamic analysis of chemical, physical and biological processes
 , a Russian news site